Peter Urban may refer to:
 Peter Urban (karate) (1934–2009), American karateka
 Peter Urban (fencer) (born 1938), Canadian fencer
 Peter Urban (translator) (1941–2013), German writer and translator
 Peter Urban (presenter) (born 1948), German musician and radio host
 Peter Urban, Danish musician, member of the band Porcelain